The 1937 North Texas State Teachers Eagles football team was an American football team that represented the North Texas State Teachers College (now known as the University of North Texas) during the 1937 college football season as a member of the Lone Star Conference. In their 9th year under head coach Jack Sisco, the team compiled a 4–4–2 record.

Schedule

References

North Texas State Teachers
North Texas Mean Green football seasons
North Texas State Teachers Eagles football